On 06:46:13 CET on 12 January 1956, a rather unusual earthquake measuring 5.8 on the moment magnitude scale struck just southeast of Budapest under Dunaharaszti at a depth of 15 km. The earthquake had a maximum European macroseismic intensity of VIII (Heavily damaging). The earthquake was felt throughout Hungary other than the eastern and western edges of the country. The event was preceded by 31 other weaker events. Widespread damage to homes and other structures were caused, 2 were killed and 48 were injured. The earthquake was one of the strongest to ever strike Hungary, and the worst during the 20th century.

Tectonic setting
The Hungary region is located within the Pannonian Basin, which is a moderately seismically active basin. The occurrence of a magnitude 6 earthquake averages at 125 years while the occurrence of a magnitude 5 earthquake averages at 15 years. The majority of the landmass of Hungary are low-lying plains, which have been covered by Holocene fluvial and alluvial sediments with a higher ground water table. Therefore, the area is prone to liquefaction which also is proven by the fact that most large, historical quakes in the area had liquefaction.

Seismic analysis shows that there is left lateral shear which creates ENE-WSW faults, right lateral shear creates WNW-ESE trending faults, E-W faults are generally reverse structures. This indicates that Hungary is generally dominated by strike-slip stresses, while slightly rotating and creating dip-slip faults.

Impacts
The impacts in terms of casualties were limited to only 2 dead, 48 injured which some were serious injuries. However, there were a lot of structures damaged with some being destroyed. At the time, a lot of structures in the area were foundationless adobe houses. 500 people were left homeless.

Geologic impacts
As a result of the earthquake, a small 3 cm wide, directed NNE-SSW surface crack was observed in Taksony. Small mud volcanoes with diameters of 4 cm were reported, which was caused by liquefaction, as well as the shallow dug wells that were filled in with sand. In the hot springs of the Rudas Baths in Budapest, the water flow of the springs increased immediately after the quake, which it later settled to its normal level.

Damages
The building damage from this event mostly occurred in Pest County, specifically in Szigetszentmiklós, Taksony and Dunaharaszti. However, serious damage was also reported in Budapest. 6 houses collapsed and several other buildings were damaged in that area. Electrical network of the city was also damaged. The overhead power lines of the Soroksár suburban railway malfunctioned relative to the electrical network. Parts of the Csepel Automobile Factory were damaged. 3,144 out of 3,500 buildings in Dunaharaszti were damaged or destroyed and were left uninhabitable. Among the damaged buildings, a church in Taksony and the city council building in Dunaharaszti were seriously damaged. Over 50 tombstones in the same area were overturned. Damages from the earthquake were observed as far as Sződliget and Kalocsa where a few poor quality chimneys were damaged.

Related events
Over the next few years, more earthquakes struck the nearby area of the 1956 event, including a 4.8 at Heves County in 2013, a 4.5 at Komárom-Esztergom County in 2011 and a 4.9 at Veszprém County in 1985.

See also
 List of earthquakes in 1956
 1763 Komárom earthquake
 Geology of the Western Carpathians

References

External links

1956 earthquakes
Earthquakes in Hungary
1956 in Hungary
1956 disasters in Hungary
January 1956 events in Europe
History of Budapest